The Cyber Corps is the newest branch of the United States Army.

The US Army describes it as "a maneuver branch with the mission to conduct defensive and offensive cyberspace operations (DCO and OCO). Cyber is the only branch designed to directly engage threats within the cyberspace domain."

It was established on 1 September 2014 by then-Secretary of the Army, John M. McHugh.

References

Military units and formations established in 2014
Branches of the United States Army